Nestor is a given name of Greek origin. In Greek mythology it comes from that of Nestor, the son of Neleus, the King of Pylos and Chloris. The Greek derivation is from a combination of "νέομαι" [neomai] - "go back", and "νόστος" [nostos] - "one who returns from travels".

People with the name 
 Nestor of Gaza (died c. 362), early Christian martyr
 Nestor of Laranda (2nd–3rd century), Greek poet
 Nestor of Magydos or Saint Nestor, Christian saint (died 250)
 Nestor of Thessaloniki, another saint (died c. 300)
 Nestorius (c.386–c.451), Patriarch of Constantinople, 428–431
 Nestor the Chronicler (c.1056–c.1114), reputed author of the earliest East Slavic chronicle
 Néstor Botero (1919-1996), Colombian journalist, writer and merchant
 Nestor Carbonell (born 1967), American actor
 Nestor Forster (1963–), Brazilian diplomat
 Néstor García (disambiguation), multiple people
 Nestor Ignat (1918–2016), Romanian journalist and writer
 Néstor Kirchner (1950–2010), Former President of Argentina
 Nestor Kukolnik (1809–1868), Russian writer
 Nestor Lakoba (1893–1936), Bolshevik leader in Abkhazia
 Nestor Makhno (1888–1934), 20th-century Ukrainian anarcho-communist
 Néstor Martín-Fernández de la Torre (1887–1938), Spanish painter from the Canary Islands
 Nestor Mendez (born 1971), Belizean politician and diplomat
 Néstor Ortigoza (born 1984), Paraguayan footballer
 Néstor Pitana (born 1975), Argentine football referee and former actor
 Néstor Rego (born 1962), Galician politician
 Nestor Roqueplan (1805–1870), French writer
 Nestor Serrano (born 1955), American actor
 Nestor J. Zaluzec (born 1952), American scientist

Fictional characters
 Nestor, a fictional butler character in the Tintin book series
 Nestor Burma, created by French crime novelist Léo Malet
 Nestor, the Long–Eared Christmas Donkey, fictional character from animated television special produced by Rankin/Bass Productions. It originally premiered on ABC on December 
 Nestor, in the animated television series Shorty McShorts' Shorts
 Nestor, in the animated television series Scaredy Squirrel
 Néstor, a penguin in the film Happy Feet
 Nestor 10, the NS-series robot in the series of short-stories I, Robot
 Prince Nestor, in the animated television series World of Quest
 Nestor Willow, husband of Clarice Willow, in the TV series Caprica
 Nestor, a group consciousness in the movie Battle Beyond the Stars

See also 
 Nestor (surname)

References 
Behind the Name

Given names of Greek language origin
Greek masculine given names
Spanish masculine given names
English masculine given names